Henry Charles Cadogan, 4th Earl Cadogan PC (15 February 1812 – 8 June 1873), styled Viscount Chelsea between 1820 and 1864, was a British diplomat and Conservative politician. He served as Captain of the Yeomen of the Guard between 1866 and 1868.

Background and education
Cadogan was born at South Audley Street, Mayfair, London, the second but eldest surviving son of George Cadogan, 3rd Earl Cadogan, by his wife Honoria Louisa Blake, daughter of Joseph Blake. He was educated at Eton and Oriel College, Oxford.

Diplomatic and political career
Cadogan initially joined the Diplomatic Service and was an attaché in St Petersburg from 1834 to 1835. In 1841 he was elected Member of Parliament (MP) for Reading, a seat he held until 1847, and then represented Dover from 1852 to 1857.
 He then returned to the Diplomatic Service and served as Secretary of the Paris Embassy from 1858 to 1859. In 1864 he succeeded his father in the earldom and entered the House of Lords. When the Conservatives came to power under Lord Derby in 1866, Cadogan was sworn of the Privy Council and appointed Captain of the Yeomen of the Guard, a post he held until 1868, the last year under the premiership of Benjamin Disraeli.

Apart from his diplomatic and political careers, Lord Cadogan was the Colonel of the Royal Westminster Militia, appointed on 6 December 1841. On 13 March 1865 he became Honorary Colonel of the regiment.

Family
Lord Cadogan married Mary Sarah Wellesley, daughter of Valerian Wellesley, on 13 July 1836 in Durham Cathedral. They had four sons and two daughters. The Countess Cadogan died in February 1873, aged 65. Lord Cadogan only survived her by four months and died at Woodrising, Norfolk, in June 1873, aged 61. His eldest son George succeeded in the earldom.

References

External links 

1812 births
1873 deaths
People educated at Eton College
Alumni of Oriel College, Oxford
Earls Cadogan
Members of the Privy Council of the United Kingdom
Conservative Party (UK) MPs for English constituencies
UK MPs 1841–1847
UK MPs 1852–1857
Cadogan, E4
H
Members of the Parliament of the United Kingdom for Reading
Conservative Party (UK) hereditary peers
Members of the Parliament of the United Kingdom for Dover
Middlesex Militia officers